Sergej Ćetković (born 8 March 1976) is a Montenegrin recording artist. He lives and works in the Serbian capital of Belgrade. Ćetković represented Montenegro in the Eurovision Song Contest 2014.

Biography

Early life 
Sergej Ćetković was born in Podgorica, SR Montenegro, Yugoslavia on 8 March 1976.

Career 
He made his first contact with music when he was only seven years old. His first appearance was as a member of the youngest Montenegrin group at that time called Vatrena srca (Fiery hearts). He played piano and sang vocals. It was then when he felt the need to become a part of the professional musical life. He started his career as a singer in 1998 at the well known festival called Sunčane skale with the song Bila si ruža (You were a rose). Two years after his solo debut, he published his first CD called Kristina in December 2000. The CD was big success and young publishing company Goraton bought the copyrights from Pogorica's Hi-Fi centre and reprinted the CD with new label and started to sell it in all territories of former Yugoslavia.

Exactly two years after his first CD, he published his second CD called Budi mi voda (Be my water) in December 2002 with 12 new songs with the company Goraton. In 2003 he participated at Budva's festival (Budvanski festival) with the song Postojim i ja which won the best arrangement award. In 2005, Goraton published his The Best Of compilation.

After this, Sergej presented to the media his third CD called Kad ti zatreba with 10 new songs. The most popular song from this last album is called Pogledi u tami.

In year 2007, he had an extremely successful tour throughout Serbia and Montenegro, which was completely sold out, and for every town, additional evenings had to be scheduled. Such success was unexpected by, perhaps, everyone. The biggest hit of the tour was the song Pogledi u tami.

On 19 November 2013, Ćetković was chosen to represent Montenegro at the Eurovision Song Contest 2014 with the song Moj svijet. He qualified from the first semi-final and represented Montenegro in the final on 10 May, a first time that Montenegro participated in the final. In the end, he scored 37 points, placing 19th out of 26 countries.

Discography 
Kristina (2000)
Budi mi voda (2003)
Kad ti zatreba (2005)
Pola moga svijeta (2007)
2 minuta (2010)
Moj svijet (2015)

Compilations 
The Best Of... (2005)
Sergej Live (2006)
Balade (2011)

Soundtrack 
Pogledi u tami - A View from Eiffel Tower (2005)

References

External links

1976 births
Living people
Musicians from Podgorica
21st-century Montenegrin male singers
21st-century Serbian male singers
Eurovision Song Contest entrants of 2014
Eurovision Song Contest entrants for Montenegro
Articles containing video clips